Pachydactylus geitje, also known commonly as the ocellated gecko, the ocellated thick-toed gecko and the Cradock thick-toed gecko, is a tiny species of thick-toed gecko, a lizard in the family Gekkonidae. The species is indigenous to the Western Cape of South Africa.

Description
P. geitje is a very colourful, mottled little gecko. Its smooth (almost silky) body is usually covered in dark-edged white spots.

Habitat
P. geitje typically lives on the ground among debris and under rocks. Further inland it only lives higher in the mountains where rocky outcrops provide it with sufficient places to hide.

Reproduction
Pachydactylus geitje lays a clutch of two tiny eggs in the summer.

References

Further reading
Boulenger GA (1885). Catalogue of the Lizards in the British Museum (Natural History). Second Edition. Volume I. Geckonidæ .... London: Trustees of the British Museum (Natural History). (Taylor and Francis, printers). xii + 436 pp. + Plates I-XXXII. (Pachydactylus ocellatus, pp. 205–206).
Branch, Bill (2004). Field Guide to Snakes and other Reptiles of Southern Africa. Third Revised edition, Second impression. Sanibel Island, Florida: Ralph Curtis Books. 399 pp. . (Pachydactylus geitje, p. 254 + Plate 82).
Loveridge A (1947). "Revision of the African Lizards of the Family Gekkonidae". Bulletin of the Museum of Comparative Zoology at Harvard College 98 (1): 1-469. (Pachydactylus geitje, pp. 350–352).
Sparrman A (1778). "Befkrifning och berättelfe om LACERTA GEITJE, en obekant och giftig ÖDLA ifrân Goda Hopps Udden ". Götheborgska Wetenskaps och Witterhets Samhallets Handlingar, Wetenskaps Afdelningen Forsta Stycket, Götheborg 1: 75-78. (Lacerta geitje, new species, p. 75). (in Swedish).

geitje
Endemic reptiles of South Africa
Natural history of Cape Town
Lizards of Africa
Reptiles of South Africa
Reptiles described in 1778
Taxa named by Anders Sparrman